The Madrid bombings were car bomb attacks carried out by the armed Basque separatist group ETA in Madrid, Spain on 21 June 1993, which killed 7 people and injured a further 29. The target was an army vehicle transporting members of the army. The dead included four Lieutenant colonels, a Commander, a Sergeant and the civilian driver of the vehicle. This was ETA's deadliest attack of 1993.

Background
ETA had previously placed car bombs in Madrid, the deadliest being the Plaza República Dominicana bombing in July 1986, which had killed 12 Civil Guards. The attack came 16 months after the 1992 Madrid attack, when ETA had killed four members of the military and a civilian employee of the army and a year after another car bomb attack targeting the military had left 13 people wounded. It was ETA's first attack in the capital since 30 December 1992, when they had killed a retired civil guard.

The bombing occurred 15 days after the Spanish general election and came at a time when negotiations on forming a coalition government were under way.

The attacks
The first and main attack occurred at 0815 on Joaquín Costa Street, near the corner of Glorieta López de Hoyos. Forty kilos of explosives had been placed inside an Opel Corsa killing seven and causing material damage to 14 nearby buildings, resulting in 90 families having to leave their homes temporarily. The second attack occurred an hour later on Serrano Street, 50 metres away, in a high security zone near the American and French embassies. It injured school children who had been waiting for their school bus. The car used was a red Ford, containing four or five kilos of explosives, which had been parked there a half hour before the attack. The exact target of the second bomb was unclear.

Reactions
The attack was condemned by all the main Spanish political parties and led to the King of Spain cancelling his participation in the Centre of Defense Studies. In the Basque Country, a five-minute break in the working day in memory of the victims was organised. The Spanish Ministry of the Interior blamed the attacks on ETA's Madrid commando, which had been reconstituted in 1991. Police sources identified María Soledad Iparraguirre, alias "Anboto" or "Marisol", as one of those involved in the attack. Anboto was arrested in France in October 2004 and in December 2010 was sentenced to 20 years in prison.

Later investigation
In 2013, on the eve of the expiration of the case's statute of limitations, journalist Pablo Romero – son of lieutenant colonel Juan Romero Alvárez, one of the victims of the 1993 attack – began a new investigation of the case after discovering a new clue while re-reading the eight tomes that made up the case file. The new clue led Spain's National Court to reopen its own investigation and summon convicted terrorist Jesús García Corporales as a formal suspect.

Romero's investigation became the subject of a series of special reports  published in El Español in 2013 in which he indicated that members of ETA's Madrid cell were directly responsible for the attack, and where he also highlighted how the Spanish State had neglected to do its part both in preventing the bombing and later pursuing guilty parties. In 2018, Romero turned the story into one of Spain's most listened-to podcasts, Las Tres Muertes de Mi Padre (My Father's Three Deaths), which received the 2018 Ondas Award, one of Spain's most prestigious journalism prizes.

References

ETA (separatist group) actions
Mass murder in 1993
Car and truck bombings in Spain
Terrorist incidents in Spain
1990s in Madrid
Crime in Madrid
1993 murders in Spain
Terrorist incidents in Spain in 1993